The Manchurian sika deer or Dybowski's sika deer (Cervus nippon mantchuricus or Cervus nippon dybowskii ) is a subspecies of deer, the largest of the 14 subspecies of sika deer. It was first described by Robert Swinhoe in 1864.

Geographic range
The Manchurian sika deer was formerly found in Manchuria (northeastern China), Korea, and the Russian Far East. Today it is likely to be extinct in China and Korea, but about 9,000 individuals still live in the sparsely populated areas of Primorsky Krai in Russia. There are many captive breeding programs in Europe, for hunting and meat, including Poland.

Description

Reproduction
Pregnancy lasts up to 221 days, and one young is born.

Etymology
Both the subspecific name, dybowskii, and the common name, Dybowski's sika deer, are in honor of Polish naturalist Benedykt Dybowski, who discovered this deer when he was exploring Siberia after completing his katorga term.

Bibliography
 Apollonio, Marco; Andersen, Reidar; Putman, Rory. 2010. European Ungulates and Their Management in the 21st Century. Cambridge, New York: Cambridge University Press. . p. 248.

Cervus
Mammals of Asia
Mammals of Korea
Mammals of Siberia
Mammals of Russia
Mammals of China